A Category B service is the former term for a Canadian discretionary specialty television channel which, as defined by the Canadian Radio-television and Telecommunications Commission, may be carried by all subscription television providers. Such services were called Category 2 until September 1, 2011.

Unlike Category A services, Category B services are not protected as to format. They are licensed to broadcast within defined formats which are not provided by or overly close to an existing protected channel, but their formats are not protected themselves and need not protect other Category B services. Also unlike Category A services, a Category B service does not have guaranteed cable carriage rights, but must directly negotiate carriage with cable distributors. Category B services encompass both pay television and specialty channels.

In December 2012, the CRTC exempted from formal licensing services with less than 200,000 subscribers that would otherwise meet the definition of a Category B service, and services which air 90% of their programming in a language other than English, French, or languages of aboriginal peoples in Canada.

Henceforth, most Canadian specialty channels (except for national news and mainstream sports channels, which are classified as Category C services) will be licensed as Category B services.

Category B specialty services

The following is a list of currently launched and officially licensed Category B services in Canada:

English

 ABC Spark
 Adult Swim
 Animal Planet
 ATN Cricket Plus
 ATN DD Sports
 A.Side TV
 BBC Earth
 Cartoon Network
 Cooking Channel
 Commonwealth Broadcasting Network
 Daystar Television Canada
 DejaView
 Discovery Science
 Discovery Velocity
 Disney Channel
 Disney XD
 DIY Network
 Dorcel TV Canada
 ESPN Classic
 EuroWorld Sport
 Fight Network
 FX
 Game+
 GameTV
 Global News: BC 1
 HIFI
 Hollywood Suite
 Hollywood Suite 70s Movies
 Hollywood Suite 80s Movies
 Hollywood Suite 90s Movies
 Hollywood Suite 00s Movies
 HPItv
 HPItv Canada
 HPItv International
 HPItv Odds
 HPItv West
 Investigation Discovery
 Leafs Nation Network
 Lifetime
 Love Nature
 Makeful
 MovieTime
 Nat Geo Wild
 National Geographic
 NBA TV Canada
 Nickelodeon
 Penthouse TV
 Playmen TV
 Red Hot TV
 Rewind
 Salt + Light Television
 Silver Screen Classics
 Smithsonian Channel
 Sportsman Channel
 Sportsnet World
 Stingray Country
 Stingray Juicebox
 Stingray Loud
 Stingray Naturescape
 Stingray Retro
 Stingray Vibe
 The Rural Channel
 Water Television Network
 Wild TV
 WildBrainTV

French
 Avis de Recherche
 Casa
 Dorcel TV Canada
 Frissons TV
 Ici Explora
 Investigation
 MOI ET CIE
 Prise 2
 Télémagino
 Yoopa
 Zeste

Multicultural

 Aaj Tak
 ATN SAB TV
 ATN Times Now
 ATN Zoom
 FPTV
 Filmy
 Mediaset Italia
 Mediaset TGCOM 24
 New Tang Dynasty Television
 SSTV
 Univision Canada
 Zee Bollywood
 Zee Cinema
 Zee TV Canada

Category B pay services

French
 Cinépop

Exempted Category B services

English
 AOV Adult Movie Channel
 beIN Sports Canada
 Exxxtasy TV
 FEVA TV
 Maleflixxx Television
 REV TV Canada
 Stingray Country
 Stingray Now 4K
 The Cult Movie Network
 Toon-A-Vision
 Vertical TV
 XITE 4K
 XXX Action Clips Channel

French
 PalmarèsADISQ par Stingray
 Stingray Hits!

Ethnic

 Abu Dhabi TV
 Al-Nahar TV
 Al-Nahar Drama
 Al Resalah
 All TV
 All TV K
 ATN Aastha TV
 ATN ARY Digital
 ATN B4U Movies
 ATN B4U Music
 ATN Bangla
 ATN Brit Asia TV
 ATN Colors Bangla
 ATN Colors Marathi
 ATN DD Bharati
 ATN DD Urdu
 ATN Food Food
 ATN Gujarati
 ATN IBC Tamil
 ATN Jaya TV
 ATN Movies
 ATN MTV India
 ATN News 18
 ATN PM One
 ATN Punjabi
 ATN Punjabi 5
 ATN Punjabi News
 ATN Punjabi Plus
 ATN Rishtey
 ATN Sikh Channel
 ATN Sony Aath
 ATN Sony Max
 ATN Sony Mix
 ATN Sony TV
 ATN SVBC
 ATN Tamil Plus
 ATN Urdu
 BBC Arabic
 Big Magic International
 Canada Chinese TV
 Canada National TV
 CCCTV
 Chakde TV
 Channel Punjabi
 Channel Y
 CTC International
 Dream 2
 ERT World
 Fairchild TV 2 HD
 FTV
 First National
 Greek Music Channel
 German Kino Plus
 Halla Bol! Kids TV
 HRT Sat
 Hum TV
 Iran TV Network
 KHL-TV
 LS Times TV
 MEGA Cosmos
 Melody Aflam
 Melody Drama
 Melody Hits
 Momo Kids
 Montreal Greek TV
 NGTV
 Nova World
 OSN Ya Hala International
 Prime Asia TV
 ProSiebenSat.1 Welt
 PTC Punjabi
 Rawal TV
 RBTI Canada
 Rotana Aflam
 Rotana Cinema
 Rotana Classic
 Rotana Clip
 Rotana Drama
 Rotana Khalijiah
 Rotana Mousica
 RTL Living
 RTS Sat
 RTVi
 SBTN
 Schlager TV
 TET
 Tamil One
 Tamil Vision
 Telebimbi
 TeleNiños
 The Israeli Network
 Travelxp
 TVCentr International
 TVP Info
 TV Rain
 Vanakkam TV
 Win HD Caribbean
 WOWtv
 Zee 24 Taas
 Zee Bangla
 Zee Marathi
 Zee Punjabi
 Zee Salaam
 Zee Talkies
 Zee Tamil
 Zing

Defunct Category B services

 Action
 ATN NDTV 24x7
 BBC Canada
 BBC Kids
 Bloomberg TV Canada 
 bpm:tv
 Bollywood Times
 CityNews Channel
 Comedy Gold
 CoolTV
 Cosmopolitan TV
 Discovery Kids
 Dusk
 The Ecology Channel
 Edge TV
 Fine Living
 Fox Sports World Canada
 Global Reality Channel
 GolTV
 Gusto TV (Knight Enterprises)
 HSTN
 IDNR-TV
 Leonardo World
 MEGA Cosmos (Ethnic Channels Group) 
 Mehndi TV
 MSNBC Canada
 Niagara News TV
 Nuevo Mundo Television
 Persian Vision
 The Pet Network
 RTVi+
 Sundance Channel
 Talentvision 2 HD
 Teletoon Retro
 Télétoon Rétro
 Tonis
 TVOne Canada
 UTV Movies
 Video Italia
 X-Treme Sports

See also
 List of television stations in Canada by call sign
 List of Canadian television networks (table)
 List of Canadian television channels
 List of Canadian specialty channels
 Category A services
 Category C services
 List of foreign television channels available in Canada
 List of United States stations available in Canada
 Digital television in Canada
 Multichannel television in Canada
 List of Canadian stations available in the United States
 List of television stations in North America by media market

Notes

References

Canadian Radio-television and Telecommunications Commission
B